Cephalotes fossithorax is a species of arboreal ant of the genus Cephalotes, characterized by an odd shaped head and the ability to "parachute" by steering during a fall. See also gliding ants. The species was originally reported as Cryptocerus fossithorax in 1921, a name which is now obsolete.

References

fossithorax